Geordie Shore: Big Birthday Battle, a spin-off series of Geordie Shore, a British television programme based in Newcastle upon Tyne was confirmed on 6 February 2016 following cast member Scott's win on Celebrity Big Brother it was announced that he'd be filming for the next series of Geordie Shore the next day. However, on 12 February 2016 it was confirmed that the cast past and present would be reuniting for a mini-series to celebrate five years of the show. The series began airing on 10 May 2016. It features all of the current cast members and the return of former cast members Daniel Thomas-Tuck, James Tindale, Jay Gardner, Kyle Christie, Ricci Guarnaccio and Sophie Kasaei. The only past cast members that did not return for this series were Greg Lake, Rebecca Walker and Vicky Pattison. This series is classified as "Geordie Shore: Big Birthday Battle" and not billed as the thirteenth series. The series also features a new twist with Gaz and Charlotte going head-to-head as team captains planning the best nights out for their team. This series includes a special episode airing on the fifth birthday, on 24 May 2016 featuring the Geordie's reactions of previous episodes. The series also includes the show's 100th episode, airing on 31 May 2016. On 1 June 2016 it was announced that original cast member Charlotte Crosby had quit the show and that this would be her final series.

Cast

Team Charlotte:
Aaron Chalmers
Charlotte-Letitia Crosby
Daniel Thomas-Tuck
Holly Hagan
James Tindale
Marty McKenna
Nathan Henry
Scott Timlin

Team Gary:
Chantelle Connelly
Chloe Ferry
Gaz Beadle
Jay Gardner
Marnie Simpson
Ricci Guarnaccio
Sophie Kasaei
Kyle Christie

Duration of cast 

 = Cast member is featured in this episode.
 = Cast member voluntarily leaves the house.
 = Cast member returns to the house.
 = Cast member leaves the series.
 = Cast member returns to the series.
 = Cast member does not feature in this episode.
 = Cast member is not officially a cast member in this episode.

Episodes

Ratings

References

2016 British television seasons
Series 12